Dere is a genus of beetles belonging to the family Cerambycidae.

The species of this genus are found in Japan and Southern Africa.

Species:

Dere acaciae 
Dere adelpha 
Dere affinis

References

Cerambycidae
Cerambycidae genera